Hawking is an English language surname with origin from falconry. Variations include Hawken and Hawkins. Notable people with the surname include:

 Fred Hawking (born 1909), Australian rules footballer
 Jane Wilde Hawking (born 1944), first wife of Stephen Hawking
 Lucy Hawking (born 1970), English journalist and novelist
 Michael Hawking (b. 1952), Australian rules footballer
 Stephen Hawking (1942–2018), British theoretical physicist
 The Hawking Brothers, Australian country music band including brothers Russell and Alan Hawking

Fictional characters:
 Jim Hawking, character from the anime series Outlaw Star

English-language surnames
Occupational surnames
English-language occupational surnames